Marshfield Motor Speedway is a half-mile asphalt oval motor racetrack built by Jim Langreck that is located at 10853 County Rd H, 3.5 miles west of Marshfield, Wisconsin. The land the track sits on was originally purchased by Mr. Langreck in 1972. The track opened as a half-mile clay oval in 1977. It held a Dairyland Midget Series race in 1985.

In 1995 the track was paved for the start of the 1996 racing season. Wayne Brevik managed the track starting in 2006. The track features Late Models, Super Stocks, Pure Stocks, and two 4-cylinder classes.

Several touring series have visited the track including ARCA Midwest Tour and the Mid-American Stock Car Series.

Notable drivers

Drivers from the track who have progressed to NASCAR:
Claire Decker
Paige Decker
Natalie Decker
Paul Menard

Images

References

External links

 Marshfield Motor Speedway - official site

Buildings and structures in Wood County, Wisconsin
Motorsport venues in Wisconsin